Jeinkler Aguirre (born 14 June 1990 in Camaguey) is a Cuban diver. At the 2008 Olympics, he competed in the men's 10 m platform diving event.  He competed in the same event at the 2012 Summer Olympics and in the Men's synchronized 10 metre platform with José Antonio Guerra.

References

Cuban male divers
1990 births
Living people
Olympic divers of Cuba
Divers at the 2008 Summer Olympics
Divers at the 2012 Summer Olympics
Divers at the 2011 Pan American Games
Pan American Games silver medalists for Cuba
Pan American Games medalists in diving
Divers at the 2015 Pan American Games
Divers at the 2019 Pan American Games
Medalists at the 2011 Pan American Games
Medalists at the 2015 Pan American Games
21st-century Cuban people